The Gaon Album Chart is a South Korean record chart that ranks the best-selling albums and EPs in South Korea. It is part of the Gaon Music Chart, which launched in February 2010. The data is compiled by the Ministry of Culture, Sports and Tourism and the Korea Music Content Industry Association based upon weekly/monthly physical album sales by six major South Korean distributors: Kakao M, SM Entertainment, Sony Music Korea, Warner Music Korea, Universal Music and Stone Music Entertainment.

Weekly charts

Monthly charts

References

External links
  Current Gaon Album Chart

2021
Korea, South albums
2021 in South Korean music